Dan Dowling (1906–1993) was an American cartoonist. His work was published in the New York Herald Tribune, the Omaha World Herald, and the Kansas City Star. Some of his work can be seen at the Brooklyn Museum.

References

1906 births
1993 deaths
American cartoonists